Sylvie Desmarescaux (born 6 September 1950) is a French politician and a former member of the Senate of France. She represented the Nord department.

References
Page on the Senate website 

1950 births
Living people
French Senators of the Fifth Republic
Women members of the Senate (France)
21st-century French women politicians
Senators of Nord (French department)
Place of birth missing (living people)